Konni Zilliacus (13 September 1894 – 6 July 1967) was the Member of Parliament for Gateshead from 1945 until 1950, and for Manchester Gorton from 1955 until his death. He was a left-wing Labour Party politician.

Zilliacus spoke nine languages fluently and international issues absorbed much of his energy, both as an official of the League of Nations between the wars, and as a member of the House of Commons in the post-war period. He was widely considered to have had communist sympathies, this led him into conflict with the Labour Party leadership and in 1949 he was expelled from the party. In 1950 he lost his seat in parliament, he was re-admitted by Labour in 1952, and returned to the Commons in 1955.

Zilliacus campaigned for less spending on weapons. He was a founder member of the Campaign for Nuclear Disarmament and opposed the Vietnam War. His father was Konrad Viktor Zilliacus, a Finnish independence activist.

Early life 
Zilliacus was born in Kobe, Japan, the son of exiled Finnish-nationalist Konrad Viktor (Konni) Zilliacus (1855–1924) and American-born Lilian McLaurin Grafe (1873–1938). He travelled the world with his parents until 1909, when they settled in England. Zilliacus then attended Bedales School in Hampshire, where he became friends with Josiah Clement Wedgwood's sons. He attended Yale University in the US, graduating first in his class in 1915.

During World War I, he applied to the British Royal Flying Corps but was denied for physical reasons. Instead, he found work as an orderly for a French medical unit near the front lines. Soon invalided out of the medical corps with diphtheria, Zilliacus returned to Britain and joined the Union of Democratic Control and worked for the Liberal Party MPs Noel Buxton and Norman Angell. He travelled with Wedgwood to Russia, where he developed a sympathy for the October Revolution, and leaked details of the British intervention in the Russian Civil War to the press. In 1919, newly married to Eugenia Nowicka and with a recently-born daughter, Stella Zilliacus, he joined the British Labour Party.

League of Nations Secretariat
Being multilingual, he found work as the British envoy to the League of Nations alongside Philip Noel-Baker. In 1931 during the Manchurian Crisis he wrote speeches for the League's committee for Cooperation with China along with Alfred Sze, Koo, and Quo Tai-Chi. He was Geneva's official interpreter for visiting Russians. It was long claimed that, writing as "C. Howard-Ellis", he wrote the text book for the League: Origins, Structure, and Working of the League of Nations. However, it has been demonstrated that the real author was 'Dick' Ellis.

Zilliacus maintained a correspondence with C. P. Scott of The Manchester Guardian, which in 1935 helped generate popular support within Britain for sanctions against Italy should it attempt to conquer Ethiopia, an invasion which was launched later in the year.  He wrote many articles and letters on international affairs on a pro bono basis, usually under pen names such as Vigilantes.

Zilliacus was a firm believer in the power of multinational organizations to prevent war, but he could not lead British foreign policy to work through the League. He worked diligently for the League of Nations until the Nazi invasion of Czechoslovakia, when he resigned from the Secretariat of the League of Nations.

Parliament
In World War II, Zilliacus worked for the Ministry of Information and joined the 1941 Committee.

Election to parliament
He was elected as Member of Parliament for Gateshead in 1945 and became known as a left-wing critic of government foreign policy.

Expulsion from Labour party
Zilliacus was frequently accused of being a communist because he was sympathetic to Soviet policies and frequently contributed articles to liberal British publications, but he was not affiliated with the Communist Party of Great Britain. In 1947 George Orwell called him one of the "crypto-communists in Westminster." 1949, Zilliacus voted against joining NATO and remained an open critic of Foreign Secretary Ernest Bevin and his anti-Soviet policies. In 1949, he was expelled from the party, along with Leslie Solley. To compensate, he helped found the Labour Independent Group, although he would later leave the group when it supported Joseph Stalin over Josip Broz Tito. He sought re-election in the 1950 general election, but he lost his seat to Labour Party candidate Arthur Moody. Zilliacus was also sympathetic to Communist Yugoslavia. 
During the show-trial of Rudolf Slánský in Czechoslovakia in 1952, Slánský was forced to confess that he had given information to Zilliacus while "planning the restoration of capitalism in Czechoslovakia"; Zilliacus dismissed the accusation as "quite fantastic".

Return to parliament
In 1952, he was readmitted to the Labour Party, and he won the Manchester Gorton constituency in the 1955 general election. He held the seat until his death, on 6 July 1967. He became a founder member of the Campaign for Nuclear Disarmament and in 1961 was suspended from the party for several months for writing an article for a Czech magazine. Zilliacus was a prominent pacifist, pushing for less spending on arms and nuclear testing during the 1950s and opposing the Vietnam War during the 1960s. He died of leukaemia, aged 72. According to one historian, Zilliacus died "an unrepentant admirer of both Harold Wilson and N. S. Khrushchev".

Personal life 
Zilliacus married, in 1919, Eugenia Nowicka, a 19-year-old Polish woman revolutionary whom he had met while in Siberia. She took the name Eugenia Nowicka Zilliacus.

Zilliacus never married his arguably more important or better-known "wife", Jan Trimble, daughter of Laurence Trimble, an American film director of the silent screen era, though she took the name Zilliacus and had a daughter by him in 1945. The Zilliacus family (she had other children) lived from the 1940s onward in the St. John's Wood and nearby Maida Vale areas of London, where she was a London Zoo volunteer and, until her death in 1999, a stalwart of the local (Paddington) Constituency Labour Party.

Works
Zilliacus wrote under several pseudonyms, as given here.

 

James Cotton  ‘"The Standard Work in English on the League” and Its Authorship: Charles Howard Ellis, an Unlikely Australian Internationalist’, History of European Ideas, 42:8, 1089-1104, DOI: 10.1080/01916599.2016.1182568.

References
Spartacus on Konni Zilliacus

External links 

Paul Flewers, Review: A Life for Peace and Socialism
 

1894 births
1967 deaths
People from Kobe
Labour Party (UK) MPs for English constituencies
UK MPs 1945–1950
UK MPs 1955–1959
UK MPs 1959–1964
UK MPs 1964–1966
UK MPs 1966–1970
British people of Finnish descent
British people of Swedish descent
British people of Scottish descent
British people of American descent
British people of World War I
Members of the Fabian Society
People educated at Bedales School
Yale University alumni
Deaths from leukemia